Mene is a genus of fish.

Mene may also refer to:

Businesses

Mythology
Selene, the Greek moon-goddess and personification of the Moon
Mene (goddess), another name for Selene as the goddess presiding over the months

People with the surname
Bernice Mene, New Zealand netball player
Chris Mene, New Zealand discus thrower
Pierre-Jules Mêne, French-American sculptor
Sally Mene, New Zealand discus and javelin thrower

Other uses
Mene (unit), the ancient Aramaic word denoting money, or a weight of gold or silver
 an Empire ship
"Mene" (song) a single by American rock band, Brand New

See also

, the phrase written "on the wall" in the Biblical book of Daniel

Menes (disambiguation)
Mena (disambiguation)
Mina (disambiguation)